Drawbase Software, founded in 1986, is the developer of Drawbase, an integrated workplace management system (IWMS) and Business Infrastructure Management (BIM) solution. This product line includes several optional software applications, such as the Move Manager, Data Center Manager and the MEP Manager, which serve to enhance facility management.

The company’s corporate headquarters are located in Lyndhurst, New Jersey, with an additional office located in Waltham, Massachusetts. Drawbase Software has partners internationally as well, in areas including the Netherlands, United Kingdom, Belgium, France, Germany, Italy, Australia, Asia, The Middle East, and India.

Drawbase was acquired by Graphisoft on April 3, 2000. Ownership of Drawbase was then transferred from Graphisoft to Drawbase Software on July 1, 2005.

Drawbase Software expanded the line of products to provide point applications in a wide range of areas in the FM market with Data Center Manager and Hazardous Materials tracking being the latest offerings.

In 2010, IBM selected Drawbase Software as the vendor to provide an integrated solution with Maximo. IBM licensed the Drawbase suite of solutions including the namesake Drawbase for FM, Workplace Manager, Data Center Manager for global distribution under the IBM name of Maximo for Space Management and DCIM.

Four Rivers Software, the developers of TMS, also licensed the Drawbase suite of products in 2010.  They licensed the product suite for limited distribution to the non-government health care market in the United States under the name TMS CAFM.  Accruent recently acquired Four Rivers Software and the TMS products.

Drawbase recently announced a relationship with Oracle and the PeopleSoft group of products with focus on the EAM and HR areas.

References

External links
Graphisoft Acquires Drawbase
Drawbase Software International Partners
Drawbase UK Partners/Resellers
IBM Licenses Drawbase Products

Companies based in New Jersey